Dobson Mills is a historic industrial complex and national historic district located in the Hunting Park Industrial Area of Philadelphia, Pennsylvania.  It encompasses 19 contributing buildings, 2 contributing sites, and 2 contributing structures.  They were built between 1858 and 1928, and are primarily of heavy timber frame construction with load bearing masonry walls.  They range from two to five stories in height.  The complex included blanket, overcoat, and wool yarn production facilities, a carpet mill, and plush mill.

It was added to the National Register of Historic Places in 1988.

References

Industrial buildings and structures on the National Register of Historic Places in Philadelphia
Historic districts in Philadelphia
Historic districts on the National Register of Historic Places in Pennsylvania
Textile mills in the United States